Strynø Kalv is a small privately owned Danish island in the South Funen Archipelago, lying west of Strynø. Strynø Kalv covers an area of 0.458 km2. A large part of the island remains in its natural state with farm animals grazing.

A part of the island is preserved for the conservation of the European fire-bellied toad.

References 

Danish islands in the Baltic
Islands of Denmark
Geography of Langeland Municipality